Tides' Thoreau Center for Sustainability are green nonprofit centers that house more than 70 nonprofit organizations in San Francisco and New York City. Thoreau Centers for Sustainability are operated by Tides Shared Spaces, a Tides initiative.

History
In 1994, the Thoreau Center for Sustainability was proposed to The Presidio Trust in San Francisco, California and opened in 1996. It is an adaptive reuse of the Letterman Army Hospital.

In 2006, a Thoreau Center for Sustainability opened in Lower Manhattan, New York.

References

External links
Thoreau Centers for Sustainability homepage
Tides homepage

Sustainability organizations
Environmental organizations based in California
Non-profit organizations based in San Francisco
Environmental organizations established in 1994
1994 establishments in California
Environmental organizations established in 2006
2006 establishments in New York City